The Treasure of Jamaica Reef is a 1975 American film directed by Virginia L. Stone.

The film is also known as Evil in the Deep (American reissue title).

Cast

Soundtrack

See also
 List of American films of 1975

External links
 
 
 

1975 films
1970s adventure films
Films based on American novels
Films set in Jamaica
Seafaring films
Treasure hunt films
Underwater action films
1970s English-language films
American adventure films
1970s American films